The 2021-22 Wisconsin Badgers men's ice hockey season was the 73rd season of play for the program. They represented the University of Wisconsin–Madison in the 2021–22 NCAA Division I men's ice hockey season. This marked the 21st season in the Big Ten Conference. They were coached by Tony Granato, in his sixth season, playing their home games at Kohl Center.

Season
Despite losing its top 4 scorers from the previous season, Wisconsin entered the year ranked 13th in the nation. However, That soon proved to be a bit of wishful thinking and the Badgers were dropped from the polls by mid-October. The team faced a murderers-row of opponents, including three consecutive weeks against top-5 teams, and a lack of offensive firepower resulted in a last-place record come December.

Despite the poor start, Wisconsin had an opportunity to turn their season around beginning with the Holiday Face–Off, the first in-season tournament held in Wisconsin since the Badger Showdown ended in 2010. The Badgers ended up winning the event, defeating Providence in a shootout, but weren't able to carry over any momentum from the championship.

In the second half of the season, Wisconsin won just three games. Their 6th-place finish came just a year after they won their first Big Ten championship. Wisconsin faced Notre Dame in the Big Ten quarterfinals and pulled off a stunning victory behind a 50-save effort from Jared Moe. Unfortunately, the Badgers couldn't get a repeat performance and lost the nest two games to the fighting Irish, ending a rather disappointing season.

Departures

Recruiting

Roster
As of September 6, 2021.

Standings

Schedule and results

|-
!colspan=12 style=";" | Exhibition

|-
!colspan=12 style=";" | Regular Season

|-
!colspan=12 ! style=""; | 

|-
!colspan=12 style=";" | Regular Season

|-
!colspan=12 style=";" |

Scoring statistics

Goaltending statistics

Rankings

Note: USCHO did not release a poll in week 24.

Players drafted into the NHL

2022 NHL Entry Draft

† incoming freshman

References

External links

2021–22
Wisconsin Badgers
Wisconsin Badgers
Wisconsin Badgers
Wisconsin Badgers